Axis College of Engineering & Technology is a private engineering college situated in Kodakara, Thrissur District of Kerala, India. The college is affiliated to University of Calicut.

References

Engineering colleges in Thrissur district
All India Council for Technical Education
Colleges affiliated with the University of Calicut